Vasilije Radović (10 September 1938 – 25 March 2019) was a Yugoslav football former goalkeeper and manager. He was born in Montenegro, but spent most of his life in Sarajevo, Bosnia and Herzegovina.

Radović (nicknamed Čiko) had also made three appearances for the Yugoslav national team between 1964 and 1965.

Club career

Early career and transfer to Željezničar
He started playing in FK Lovćen. During a friendly match with his team in 1957, FK Željezničar Sarajevo officials spotted him and decided to offer him to start playing for their club. He accepted the offer. He stayed in Željezničar for nine years.

He even scored a goal for the club in the 1963–64 league season.

Fenerbahçe
In 1966, he moved to Turkish side Fenerbahçe S.K. He won the 1966–67 Balkans Cup with the club. However, he returned to Željezničar after only one season in Fenerbahçe.

Return to Željezničar and retirement
After coming back to Željezničar, he played four more seasons until he decided to retire in 1971. because of an Achilles tendon injury. He played 307 official games for the club, 209 of them being league games, and has also scored 1 goal.

International career
During the time of Radović playing for Željezničar, he even became a candidate for the Yugoslav national team. He made his debut in an October 1964 friendly match against Hungary and since the competition was really good, he collected only a total of 3 caps, scoring no goals. Many people said that he should have played for some of the "Big Four" clubs in order to gain a regular place on goal. His final international was a September 1965 FIFA World Cup qualification match against Luxembourg.

Managerial career
After retiring, he continued to work in football. He was a youth team coach in Željezničar and in the 1976–77 season he was a first team caretaker manager for the remainder of the season, after Milan Ribar stepped down. 

He continued to work with the club in various front office roles after that. He is one of the meritorious ones for saving Željezničar during the War in Bosnia and Herzegovina.

Death
Radović died on 25 March 2019, at the age of 80 in Cetinje, Montenegro.

Honours

Player

Club
Fenerbahçe
 Balkans Cup: 1966–67

References

External links

1938 births
2019 deaths
Sportspeople from Cetinje
Association football goalkeepers
Yugoslav footballers
Yugoslavia international footballers
FK Lovćen players
FK Željezničar Sarajevo players
Fenerbahçe S.K. footballers
Yugoslav First League players
Süper Lig players
Yugoslav expatriate footballers
Expatriate footballers in Turkey
Yugoslav expatriate sportspeople in Turkey
Yugoslav football managers
FK Željezničar Sarajevo managers